The 1981–82 Washington State Cougars men's basketball team represented Washington State University for the 1981–82 NCAA Division I men's basketball season. Led by tenth-year head coach George Raveling, the Cougars were members of the Pacific-10 Conference and played their home games on campus at Beasley Coliseum in Pullman, Washington.

There was no conference tournament yet, which debuted five years later.

Washington State hosted the first two rounds in the West regional of the 48-team NCAA tournament at Beasley Coliseum. The highest seeds, conference champions #2 Oregon State and #3 Idaho, had both defeated WSU on the tartan court this season; they advanced and met in the Sweet Sixteen in Provo, Utah.

References

External links
Sports Reference – Washington State Cougars: 1981–82 basketball season

Washington State Cougars men's basketball seasons
Washington State Cougars
Washington State
Washington State